This is a list of New Zealand sportspeople who are Māori or of Māori descent. While Māori have been involved in many sports, they are particularly prominent in both forms of rugby.

Where known, the person's iwi are listed in brackets.

Association football
 Leo Bertos
Claudia Bunge (Ngāi Tuhoe)
 Moses Dyer
 Abby Erceg (Ngāpuhi)
 Rory Fallon Ngati Porou
 Amber Hearn (Ngāpuhi)
Clayton Lewis (Ngāpuhi)
 Heremaia Ngata
 Winston Reid (Tainui, Te Arawa)
 Rebecca Rolls (Ngāti Porou)
 Alex Rufer
 Shane Rufer
 Wynton Rufer (Ngāti Porou)
Paige Satchell (Ngāpuhi)
 Tamati Williams
 Kirsty Yallop

Athletics (track & field)
 Holly Robinson (Ngāi Tāhu)
Sam Tanner (Ngāpuhi)

Australian rules football

Basketball
Pero Cameron (Ngāpuhi)
Brendon Pongia

Boxing
Daniella Smith (Ngāpuhi)
Lani Daniels (Ngāti Hine)
Shane Cameron

Canoeing
 Lisa Carrington (Ngati Porou, Te Aitanga-a-Mahaki)
 Kayla Imrie (Te Whakatōhea)
Kurtis Imrie (Te Whakatōhea)
 Jaimee Lovett (Ngāti Raukawa)

Cricket
 Suzie Bates (Ngāi Tahu)
Shane Bond (Ngāpuhi)(Ngāi Tahu)
Trent Boult (Ngāi Tahu, Ngāti Porou, Ngāi Te Rangi)
 Tama Canning
 Heath Davis
Peter McGlashan(Ngāti Porou)
 Kyle Mills (Ngāi Tahu) 
 Adam Parore - the first Maori man to play test cricket for New Zealand(Ngāpuhi)
 Jesse Ryder
 Ben Stokes(Ngāpuhi)(
 Daryl Tuffey(Te Ātiawa)

Cycling
Pieter Bulling (Ngāi Tahu)
Emma Foy (Ngāpuhi)
Sam Gaze (Te Atiawa)
Dylan Kennett (Ngāi Tahu)

Diving 

 Anton Down-Jenkins (Te Arawa)

Equestrian 

 Daniel Meech

Golf 

 Michael Campbell (Ngāti Ruanui, Ngāi Rauru)

Gymnastics
 Courtney McGregor (Ngāti Kahungunu)

Hockey
 Gemma Flynn (Te Arawa, Tainui)
 Charlotte Harrison (Ngāpuhi)
 Blair Hilton (Ngāpuhi)
 Kane Russell (Ngāpuhi)
 Kayla Whitelock (Rangitāne)

Horseracing
 Michael Walker

Judo
 Darcina-Rose Manuel (Ngāti Porou)

Lawn bowls 

 Shannon McIlroy (Ngāti Porou)

Netball
A selection of Māori netball players who have represented New Zealand. Margaret Matangi, June Mariu, Waimarama Taumaunu, Temepara Bailey and Ameliaranne Ekenasio all captained New Zealand. 
Taumaunu and Noeline Taurua have both been New Zealand head coaches.

Rowing
 Kelsey Bevan
Kirstyn Goodger
Jackie Gowler (Rangitāne)
Kerri Gowler (Rangitāne)
Michael Brake (Ngāti Porou)
 Caleb Shepherd (Ngāti Porou)
 Jade Uru (Ngāi Tahu)

Rugby league

Rugby union

Sailing
 Paul Snow-Hansen (Ngāpuhi)

Softball 

 Nathan Nukunuku (Ngāti Porou)

Squash 

 Leilani Joyce (Ngāti Hine, Ngāi Te Rangi, Tainui)
 Joelle King (Ngāti Porou)

Swimming
 Lewis Clareburt (Tainui)
Erika Fairweather (Ngāi Tahu)
Cameron Leslie (Ngāpuhi)
 Corey Main (Ngāti Porou, Ngāpuhi)
 Kane Radford (Ngāti Tūwharetoa, Te Arawa)
 Emma Robinson (Ngāpuhi)

Triathlon 

 Tayler Reid (Ngāti Kahunungu)

Weightlifting 

 Kanah Andrews-Nahu (Ngāti Porou, Ngāpuhi)

References

Maori
 
Sportspeople